Ingrīda Amantova (born June 21, 1960 in Cēsis) is a Latvian-born Soviet luger who competed during the early 1980s. Competing in two Winter Olympics, she won the bronze medal in the women's singles event at Lake Placid, New York in 1980 and finished fourth in the same event at the following Winter Olympics in Sarajevo. This was the only instances Soviet or Latvian athletes won Olympic medals in women's luge.

Amantova's best overall Luge World Cup finish was second in 1982-3. She was three times the champion of Soviet Union in luge.

She was mainly training on the domestic track near Sigulda. The track was open in the 1970s and became the first one in Soviet Union. Amantova belonged to the first generation of Soviet athletes who used the track and demonstrated top-level results.

References

Notes

Sources

 

1960 births
Latvian female lugers
Living people
Lugers at the 1980 Winter Olympics
Lugers at the 1984 Winter Olympics
Soviet female lugers
Olympic lugers of the Soviet Union
Olympic medalists in luge
Medalists at the 1980 Winter Olympics
Olympic bronze medalists for the Soviet Union
People from Cēsis
Latvian Academy of Sport Education alumni
University of Latvia alumni